Zakharin Mihailov Grivev  (born 21 January 1931) is a Bulgarian cross-country skier, who participated in the 1956 Winter Olympics in Cortina d'Ampezzo.

Biography 
Grivev  participated in the 15 and 30 km cross country events at the 1956 Winter Olympics in Cortina d'Ampezzo. He finished 54th of 62 participants in the 15 km event and 44th of 54 participants in the 30 km event.

References 

  

1931 births
Possibly living people
Bulgarian male cross-country skiers
Cross-country skiers at the 1956 Winter Olympics
Olympic cross-country skiers of Bulgaria